Nepal Federal Socialist Party (abbreviated NFSPनेसंस पार्टी) is a political party in Nepal. The party was formed on 17 December 2016 by Mohammad Rizwan Ansari.

History

Background 
Mohammad Rizwan Ansari was a member of the Federal Socialist Party that was founded by Ashok Kumar Rai after breaking away from the Communist Party of Nepal (Unified Marxist-Leninist). Federal Socialist Party eventually merged with Madhesi Jana Adhikar Forum, Nepal led by Upendra Yadav and Khas Samabesi Party to form Federal Socialist Forum, Nepal. Ansari eventually broke away from the party on 4 February 2016 to form Sanghiya Nava Bichar Samuha (Federal New Thought Group). Federal New Thought Group became Nepal Federal Socialist Party on 17 December 2016. On 10 October 2017, 11 parties including Samyukta Jatiya Mukti Morcha, Mulbasi Mukti Party, Rastriya Samukti Party, Kirat Janbadi Workers Party, Nepal Shramik Shakti Party, Social Democratic Party, Bahujan Shakti Party, Rastriya Janbikas Party, Dalit Muslim Shramik Party, Dalit Adhikar Abhiyan, Gandaki, Dhaulagiri, Lumbini and Samyukta Dalit Adhikar Manch merged with the party.

Elections 
In the 2017 legislative and provincial elections, the party won one seat to the Provincial Assembly of Province No. 2 through proportional representation.

Electoral performance

Presence in various provinces

See also 

 Federal Socialist Forum, Nepal

References

2016 establishments in Nepal
Democratic socialist parties in Asia
Federalist parties in Nepal
Political parties established in 2016
Political parties of minorities in Nepal
Socialist parties in Nepal